The 2020 Oklahoma Senate election was held as part of the biennial elections in the United States. Oklahoma voters elected state senators in 24 of the state's 48 Senate districts. State senators serve four-year terms in the Oklahoma Senate.

Retirements
Two incumbents did not run for re-election in 2020. Those incumbents are:

Republicans
District 5: Joseph Silk: Retiring
District 35: Gary Stanislawski: Retiring

Incumbents defeated

In primary elections

Republicans
Four Republicans lost renomination.

District 3: Wayne Shaw lost renomination to Blake Stephens.
District 7: Larry Boggs lost renomination to 	Warren Hamilton.
District 17: Ron Sharp lost renomination to Shane Jett.
District 43: Paul Scott lost renomination to Jessica Garvin.

In the general election

Democrats
District 37: Allison Ikley-Freeman lost to Cody Rogers.

Predictions

Results summary

Close races

Summary of results by State Senate District

Detailed results by State Senate District

District 1

District 3

District 5

District 7

District 9

District 11

District 13

District 15

District 17

District 19

District 21

District 23

District 25

District 27

District 29

District 31

District 33

District 35

District 37

District 39

District 41

District 43

District 45

District 47

Special elections

District 28
A special election for Oklahoma State Senate District 28 has been called for November 3, 2020. A primary was scheduled for June 30, 2020. The candidate filing deadline was April 10, 2020. The seat became vacant after Jason Smalley resigned his seat on January 31, 2020, to take a private-sector job with Motorola Solutions Corporation.

Republican primary

General election

Notes

References

Oklahoma Senate
Senate 
Oklahoma Senate elections